

Karl Herzog (6 July 1906 – 25 January 1998) was a German officer in the Wehrmacht during World War II. He was a recipient of the Knight's Cross of the Iron Cross.

Herzog surrendered to the Red Army in the course of the Soviet April 1945 Zemland Offensive. Convicted as a war criminal in the Soviet Union, he was held until 1955. Herzog joined the Bundeswehr in 1957 and retired in 1966 as a Generalmajor.

Awards and decorations

 Knight's Cross of the Iron Cross on 17 April 1945 as Oberstleutnant and commander of Heeres Sturm-Pionier-Brigade 627 (motorisiert)

References

Citations

Bibliography

 

1906 births
1998 deaths
Bundeswehr generals
Military personnel from Nuremberg
People from the Kingdom of Bavaria
Recipients of the Gold German Cross
Recipients of the Knight's Cross of the Iron Cross
Knights of the Order of the Crown (Romania)
German prisoners of war in World War II held by the Soviet Union
Major generals of the German Army